Hypopyra africana is a moth of the family Erebidae. It is found in Botswana, Kenya, Tanzania and Zambia.

References

Moths described in 1896
Hypopyra